"I Found U" is a single by Swedish DJ Axwell featuring Max'C. The song was popular on the UK Singles Chart, reaching a peak of number 6 in August 2007. The "Remode" version became popular among fans and was widely used as the radio version. The song is still one of Axwell's most recognisable hits.

In 2010, it was included on the Swedish House Mafia mix album, Until One.

Track listing
(Promo)
"I Found U" (Radio Edit) (2:52)
"I Found U" (Classic Edit) (3:34)
"I Found U" (Vocal Remode) (5:11)
"I Found U" (Remode) (6:56)
"I Found U" (Classic Mix) (6:32)
"I Found U" (Soul Avengerz Remix) (8:22)
"I Found U" (TV Rock Remix) (7:49)
"I Found U" (Instrumental) (6:54)

Chart positions

References

2007 songs
2007 singles
Axwell songs
Songs written by Axwell
Positiva Records singles
EMI Records singles
Ultra Records singles